Ali Atshani (born May 16, 1978) is an Iranian film director, film producer and screenwriter.

Atshani started his career in 1994 and made his film debut in the drama film Habib. In 2002, Ashtani directed a documentary called Unfinished, about religious rituals in Iran. Because of the high sensitivity of this subject in the Iranian society, the documentary was banned by the government and never distributed in Iran. In 2011, he directed The President's Cell Phone, a film about Mahmoud Ahmadinejad. The film was shot over a period of one year. In 2013, 
Atshani directed the first 3D movie in the history of Iranian cinema, called Mr. Alef.

Filmography

References

External links
 

1978 births
Living people
Iranian film producers
Iranian film editors
Persian-language film directors
Iranian film score composers